Helga Diederichsen (22 September 1930 – 2005) was a Mexican breaststroke swimmer. She competed in the women's 200 metre breaststroke at the 1948 Summer Olympics.

References

External links
 

1930 births
2005 deaths
Mexican female breaststroke swimmers
Olympic swimmers of Mexico
Swimmers at the 1948 Summer Olympics
Swimmers from Mexico City
Central American and Caribbean Games gold medalists for Mexico
Central American and Caribbean Games medalists in swimming
Competitors at the 1946 Central American and Caribbean Games
20th-century Mexican women
21st-century Mexican women